This is a list of ambassadors to Norway. Note that some ambassadors are responsible for more than one country while others are directly accredited to Oslo.

Current Ambassadors to Oslo

See also
 Foreign relations of Norway
 List of diplomatic missions of Norway
 List of diplomatic missions in Norway

References
 Oslo Diplomatic List
  Order of Precedence, Oslo

 
Norway